Luosto is a fell in Finnish Lapland, in the Sodankylä municipality. It is part of Pyhä-Luosto National Park. There is a weather radar on the fell top. The Luosto ski resort and amethyst mine are nearby.

Kalevi Aho's 12th symphony is written in inspiration of this fell.

External links

 Luosto-website
 webcams

References

Inselbergs of Europe
Geography of Lapland (Finland)
Hills of Finland